Raymond L. "Ray" Loewen (born June 27, 1940) is a former business owner and political figure in British Columbia. He represented Burnaby-Edmonds in the Legislative Assembly of British Columbia from 1975 to 1979 as a Social Credit member.

Born in Steinbach, Manitoba, the son of Abraham Loewen, a funeral parlour operator, Loewen completed a degree in theology at Briercrest Bible College in Saskatchewan. When his father became ill, he took over the family business. He married Anne Heinrichs in 1962. In 1969, Loewen and his family moved to British Columbia. At that time, he also became involved in real estate and transportation.

After leaving politics, Loewen was involved in real estate for a time. During the mid-1980s, he began acquiring Canadian funeral homes. In 1987, the Loewen Group expanded into the United States. By 1997, the company had 15,000 employees and operated 1,115 funeral homes. In 1995, Jeremiah O'Keefe, a funeral home operator in Mississippi represented by Willie E. Gary won US$500 million in damages in a breach of contract suit. The large amount of punitive damages awarded relative to business assets not worth more than $4 million was criticized, but this setback led to a downturn in the company's fortunes. In 1998, Loewen stepped down as CEO and sold his shares in the company. The Loewen Group filed for bankruptcy protection in 1999; in 2002, it was restructured as the Alderwoods Group. In 2006, Alderwoods board of directors sold Alderwoods to Service Corporation International (SCI), an American funeral corporation.

In 2008, Loewen's Twin Cedars estate in Burnaby, British Columbia, was listed for sale at C$25 million, and was sold June 2012 for C$9.948 million.

References 

1940 births
Living people
British Columbia Social Credit Party MLAs
People from Steinbach, Manitoba